Mecyclothorax riedeli is a species of ground beetle in the subfamily Psydrinae. It was described by Baehr in 1992.

References

riedeli
Beetles described in 1992